Ernest Estwick (9 March 1903 – 14 November 1984) was a Guyanese cricketer. He played in three first-class matches for British Guiana from 1923 to 1926.

See also
 List of Guyanese representative cricketers

References

External links
 

1903 births
1984 deaths
Guyanese cricketers
Guyana cricketers